The Maness Schoolhouse is a historic school building at 8801 Wells Lake Road in Sebastian County, Arkansas, about  south of Barling.  It is a single-story stone structure, with a side gable roof and a projecting gable portico over its main entrance.  It was built in 1937 with funding from the Works Progress Administration, and is the only surviving structure of the former community of Massard, which was disincorporated and demolished to make way for Fort Chaffee in 1941.  Its rear porch was built in 1943 by German prisoners of war held at Fort Chaffee.

It was a one-room schoolhouse.

The building was listed on the National Register of Historic Places in 2003.

Gallery

See also
National Register of Historic Places listings in Sebastian County, Arkansas

References

School buildings on the National Register of Historic Places in Arkansas
One-room schoolhouses in Arkansas
School buildings completed in 1937
Buildings and structures in Sebastian County, Arkansas
National Register of Historic Places in Sebastian County, Arkansas